Cities and towns under the oblast's jurisdiction:
Oryol (Орёл) (administrative center)
city districts:
Severny (Северный)
Sovetsky (Советский)
Zavodskoy (Заводской)
Zheleznodorozhny (Железнодорожный)
Livny (Ливны)
Mtsensk (Мценск)
Districts:
Bolkhovsky (Болховский)
Towns under the district's jurisdiction:
Bolkhov (Болхов)
with 13 selsovets under the district's jurisdiction.
Dmitrovsky (Дмитровский)
Towns under the district's jurisdiction:
Dmitrovsk (Дмитровск)
with 12 selsovets under the district's jurisdiction.
Dolzhansky (Должанский)
Urban-type settlements under the district's jurisdiction:
Dolgoye (Долгое)
with 7 selsovets under the district's jurisdiction.
Glazunovsky (Глазуновский)
Urban-type settlements under the district's jurisdiction:
Glazunovka (Глазуновка)
with 7 selsovets under the district's jurisdiction.
Khotynetsky (Хотынецкий)
Urban-type settlements under the district's jurisdiction:
Khotynets (Хотынец)
with 8 selsovets under the district's jurisdiction.
Kolpnyansky (Колпнянский)
Urban-type settlements under the district's jurisdiction:
Kolpna (Колпна)
with 9 selsovets under the district's jurisdiction.
Korsakovsky (Корсаковский)
with 7 selsovets under the district's jurisdiction.
Krasnozorensky (Краснозоренский)
with 5 selsovets under the district's jurisdiction.
Kromskoy (Кромской)
Urban-type settlements under the district's jurisdiction:
Kromy (Кромы)
with 12 selsovets under the district's jurisdiction.
Livensky (Ливенский)
with 16 selsovets under the district's jurisdiction.
Maloarkhangelsky (Малоархангельский)
Towns under the district's jurisdiction:
Maloarkhangelsk (Малоархангельск)
with 7 selsovets under the district's jurisdiction.
Mtsensky (Мценский)
with 14 selsovets under the district's jurisdiction.
Novoderevenkovsky (Новодеревеньковский)
Urban-type settlements under the district's jurisdiction:
Khomutovo (Хомутово)
with 7 selsovets under the district's jurisdiction.
Novosilsky (Новосильский)
Towns under the district's jurisdiction:
Novosil (Новосиль)
with 7 selsovets under the district's jurisdiction.
Orlovsky (Орловский)
Urban-type settlements under the district's jurisdiction:
Znamenka (Знаменка)
with 16 selsovets under the district's jurisdiction.
Pokrovsky (Покровский)
Urban-type settlements under the district's jurisdiction:
Pokrovskoye (Покровское)
with 13 selsovets under the district's jurisdiction.
Shablykinsky (Шаблыкинский)
Urban-type settlements under the district's jurisdiction:
Shablykino (Шаблыкино)
with 7 selsovets under the district's jurisdiction.
Soskovsky (Сосковский)
with 7 selsovets under the district's jurisdiction.
Sverdlovsky (Свердловский)
Urban-type settlements under the district's jurisdiction:
Zmiyovka (Змиёвка)
with 7 selsovets under the district's jurisdiction.
Trosnyansky (Троснянский)
with 8 selsovets under the district's jurisdiction.
Uritsky (Урицкий)
Urban-type settlements under the district's jurisdiction:
Naryshkino (Нарышкино)
with 7 selsovets under the district's jurisdiction.
Verkhovsky (Верховский)
Urban-type settlements under the district's jurisdiction:
Verkhovye (Верховье)
with 10 selsovets under the district's jurisdiction.
Zalegoshchensky (Залегощенский)
Urban-type settlements under the district's jurisdiction:
Zalegoshch (Залегощь)
with 10 selsovets under the district's jurisdiction.
Znamensky (Знаменский)
with 7 selsovets under the district's jurisdiction.

References

Oryol Oblast
Oryol Oblast